Elections to High Peak Borough Council in Derbyshire, England were held on 2 May 1991. All of the council was up for election and the council stayed under no overall control.

After the election, the composition of the council was:
Labour 16
Conservative 14
Liberal Democrat 10
Independent 4

Election result

Ward results

References

1991
High Peak
1990s in Derbyshire